Munchies is a 1987 comedy horror film starring Harvey Korman, Charlie Stratton, and Nadine Van der Velde.  Directed by  Tina Hirsch, the film editor for Gremlins, the film features a similar plotline.

Plot
The protagonist's father, space archaeologist Simon Watterman, discovers a "Munchie" in a cave in Peru. Bringing the specimen back to the United States, Simon's son Paul and his girlfriend Cindy name it Arnold. Cecil Watterman, Simon's evil twin brother and snack food entrepreneur, kidnaps Arnold while Cindy and Paul are making out.

When Arnold is hurt by his kidnappers, it becomes aggressive and attacks Cecil's adopted son. Attempting to kill Arnold, they chop him into quarters, but instead of dying, Arnold multiplies into four new Munchies. The quartet of creatures develop a love of women, attacking people, beer, and junk food in the process.

Eddie is incapacitated by the Munchies as they turn their attention on Cindy and chase her through the Calsnax storage facility, but she hides from them in a shed. The Munchies begin operating the machinery and use it to cut themselves into pieces, multiplying themselves further, but Paul electrifies the assembly line with a cable, turning them to stone. He proceeds to destroy their petrified remains and Cindy reveals herself from hiding, but as they are reunited, a lone Munchie presumed to be Arnold attacks Paul. They are able to fight Arnold off and turn the Munchie to stone by electrocution, but do not destroy it since Paul wants to keep it intact for Simon's evidence.

Cecil, Melvis, and Big Ed are still trapped in the elevator, but they are released by Eddie. Paul discovers the illegal ingredients in Cecil's snacks who tries to bribe him into going along with the scheme but refuses Cecil's offer with a punch to the face. Big Ed arrests both Cecil and Melvis on the spot while Paul and the others depart.

As they return to the house with the Munchie statue, they are greeted by Simon and an enthused Dr. Crowder who offers them $25,000 for the statue, which they accept. Paul admits defeat in their bet and promises he will go to community college, but his father explains that the liquid sample analyzed from the temple was made up of unknown elements to earth and declares he has his new bestseller titled "Machu Picchu: Toxic Waste Dump of the Gods" and that Paul can pursue his comedy career in Los Angeles.

As Dr. Crowder drives off into the desert, ominous dark clouds circle overhead and lightning strikes the stone Munchie in the pickup bed. The voice of Arnold cries out "amigo” as the credits begin to roll, implying that the Munchie has been reanimated once again.

Cast
Harvey Korman as Cecil Watterman and Simon Watterman
Charles Stratton as Paul Watterman
Nadine Van der Velde as Cindy
Alix Elias as Melvis Macintosh Watterman
Charlie Phillips as Eddie
Hardy Rawls as Big Ed
Jon Stafford as Dude
Robert Picardo as Bob Marvelle
Wendy Schaal as Marge Marvelle
Buddy Holly as Scott Sherk

Lori Birdsong as Terry
Traci Huber-Sheridan as Amy
Paul Bartel as Dr. Crowder
Ellen Albertini Dow as Little Old Lady
Jerado De Cordovier as Old Indian
Roberto A. Jimenez as Ramon
Chip Heller as Burgerland Manager
Michael Lee Gogin as Burgerland Employee #1
Larry Nicholas as Burgerland Employee #2
Kevin Thompson as Burgerland Employee #3
Justin Dreyfuss as Dwight
Jan Kuljis as Biker Chick
Paul Short as Head Biker
Steven Bernstein as Dean
Solly Marx, Janet Lee Orcutt, Carol Rees, and Harry Terzian as stunt drivers
Frank Welker and Fred Newman as the Munchie voices

Production
Tina Hirsch had edited three films for Corman in the 1970s and in the mid 80s told him that she wanted to direct. Corman wanted to make a Gremlins knock off, which were profitable at the time, and, since Hirsch had edited that film, it seemed a good fit. Munchies was shot over 12 days, followed by three days of filming puppets and inserts.

References

External links

 

1987 films
1980s comedy horror films
American comedy horror films
1980s monster movies
1987 horror films
Puppet films
Films produced by Roger Corman
American monster movies
1987 comedy films
1980s English-language films
1980s American films